The President's Malaria Initiative (PMI) is a U.S. Government initiative to control and eliminate malaria, one of the leading global causes of premature death and disability. The initiative was originally launched by U.S. president George W. Bush in 2005, and has been continued by each successive U.S. president.

PMI was originally created with a mission to "reduce malaria-related mortality by 50 percent across 15 high-burden countries in sub-Saharan Africa". PMI has since expanded to 24 malaria-endemic countries in sub-Saharan Africa and 3 additional countries in the Greater Mekong Subregion of Southeast Asia, where it seeks to further reduce malaria burden and assist countries in achieving malaria elimination.

PMI works closely with national malaria programs and global partners including the World Health Organization, Roll Back Malaria, and Global Fund. Global malaria efforts, including those of PMI, have cut malaria mortality by over 60%, saved nearly 7 million lives, and prevented more than 1 billion malaria cases between 2000 and 2015. PMI currently supports malaria prevention and control for over 500 million at-risk people in Africa.

History 
The U.S. Leadership Against HIV/AIDS, Tuberculosis, and Malaria Act of 2003 originally authorized the U.S. Government to provide 5 years of malaria funding to bilateral partners and the Global Fund. PMI was subsequently launched by President George W. Bush in 2005. In 2008, PMI was reauthorized for another 5 years of funding by the Lantos-Hyde Act, which also called for development of a comprehensive U.S. Global Malaria Strategy, the latest version of which is the U.S. Global Malaria Strategy 2015-2020. PMI served as a major component of the Global Health Initiative, a six-year, $63-billion effort proposed by President Obama in May 2009.

Funding
The US government, including through PMI, is currently the largest international source of financing for malaria. PMI's global budget for FY2017 was $723 million.

Structure and governance
PMI is interagency initiative overseen by the U.S. Global Malaria Coordinator in consultation with an Interagency Advisory Group composed of representatives from USAID, CDC, the Department of State, the Department of Defense, the National Security Council, and Office of Management and Budget. The initiative is led by USAID and implemented together with CDC.  In addition to US-based staff at USAID and CDC headquarters, PMI maintains resident advisors from both agencies in each focus country.

Countries 
PMI currently provides direct support to 24 "focus" countries and 3 additional country programs in the Greater Mekong Subregion. At the time of its launch in 2005, PMI provided support to just three countries: Angola, Tanzania, and Uganda. Four additional countries (Malawi, Mozambique, Rwanda, and Senegal) were added the following year. By 2007, PMI had added Benin, Ethiopia, Ghana, Kenya, Liberia, Madagascar, Mali, and Zambia—bringing the total number of focus countries to the originally envisioned total of 15 high-burden nations.

In 2010, PMI added the Democratic Republic of the Congo, Nigeria, Guinea, Zimbabwe, and the Mekong Subregion.

In 2017, with additional funding from Congress, PMI expanded to 5 more countries: Burkina Faso, Cameroon, Cote d'Ivoire, Niger, and Sierra Leone.

Results 
PMI is estimated to have prevented 185 million malaria cases and nearly 1 million deaths between 2005 and 2017. Globally, malaria mortality fell by more than 60% between 2000 and 2015. The presence of a PMI program in a country has also been associated with a significant reduction in all-cause under-5 child mortality.

See also 
 PEPFAR
 U.S. Global Malaria Coordinator

References

External links
 Kaiser Family Foundation policy brief on PMI
 PMI website
 CDC malaria webpage

More sources
 

 
Malaria
International medical and health organizations